Posadas is the capital city of the Argentine province of Misiones, in its south, at the far north-east of the country on the left bank of the Paraná River, opposite Encarnación, Paraguay.

Posadas is the provincial centre of the government, culture and the economy. Furniture, tobacco, food, textiles and construction are its most important industries. Other important economic activities are commerce and services.

Posadas is connected to the Paraguayan city of Encarnación by the San Roque González de Santa Cruz Bridge. The port, once of great economical importance, is used for sport vessels, carrier of passengers and some boats for sand transport. The General José de San Martín Airport , at coordinates , is seven kilometres from the city, and features regular flights to Buenos Aires.

History
Father Roque González y de Santa Cruz established a town called Anunciación de Itapúa on 25 March 1615, but ten years later the settlement was moved to the other side of the Paraná River to the present location of Encarnación, Paraguay.

The first settlement was not completely abandoned, and a new San José reduction was settled there in 1628. In 1867, during the Paraguayan War, the Brazilians set up the Trinchera de San José military base there. Following the end of the war, Paraguay renounced all claims to the area, and in 1879, the town was renamed after Gervasio Antonio de Posadas, the Supreme Director of the Argentine Confederation (1814).

On 22 December 1881, the limits of the Misiones Federation were drawn, leaving Posadas within the territory of current Corrientes Province. On 30 July 1884 the National Congress decided to give Posadas to Misiones Province, and name it its capital. The National University of Misiones was established at Posadas in 1973, and in 1990, the city's cultural and economic links to Encarnación were strengthened with the completion of the San Roque González de Santa Cruz Bridge.

Public transportation
The average amount of time people spend commuting with public transit in Posadas, for example to and from work, on a weekday is 57 min. 10% of public transit riders, ride for more than 2 hours every day. The average amount of time people wait at a stop or station for public transit is 16 min, while 26% of riders wait for over 20 minutes on average every day. The average distance people usually ride in a single trip with public transit is 4.3 km, while 2% travel for over 12 km in a single direction.

Climate 

Posadas has a humid subtropical climate (Köppen Cfa).

Notable people

 José Acasuso, tennis player
 Alberto Mancini, tennis player
 Mariano Messera, soccer player
 German Cano, soccer player
 Daniel Vancsik, golf player
 Danny Veron, dj producer musician

Sports
The city's main football teams are: CD Guaraní Antonio Franco, CA Bartolomé Mitre, CA Posadas and CD Jorge Gibson Brown.

Gallery

Sister cities 
 Bergamo, Italy

 Encarnación, Paraguay

References

External links

  Municipality of Posadas – Official website.
  
  Universidad Nacional de Misiones
 Posadas Information

 
Populated places in Misiones Province
Capitals of Argentine provinces
Populated places established in 1615
Paraná River
Argentina–Paraguay border crossings
Cities in Argentina
1615 establishments in the Spanish Empire
Argentina
Misiones Province